Eriélton Carlos Pacheco (born 26 September 1970), known as Pachequinho, is a Brazilian retired footballer who played as a forward, and is a current manager.

Playing career
Pachequinho was born in Ponta Grossa, Paraná, and was a Coritiba youth graduate. He made his senior debut on 11 February 1990, in a 3–0 win against Nove de Julho, and scored his first senior goal one month later, in a match against Matsubara.

Pachequinho left Coxa in 1996, with 215 matches and 64 goals. He subsequently represented Bahia, Atlético Paranaense, Matonense, Paraná and Criciúma before retiring in 2000 at the age of 30, mainly due to injuries.

Manager career
After his retirement, Pachequinho worked at his first club Coritiba, as a scout. On 4 November 2015, after the dismissal of Ney Franco, he was appointed interim manager of the main squad.

On 9 November, Pachequinho was definitely appointed manager until the end of the year.

Honours

Manager
Coritiba
Campeonato Paranaense: 2017

Individual
Campeonato Paranaense top goalscorer: 1995

References

External links
Coritiba official profile 
Meu Time na Rede profile 

1970 births
Living people
Sportspeople from Paraná (state)
Brazilian footballers
Association football forwards
Campeonato Brasileiro Série A players
Campeonato Brasileiro Série B players
Coritiba Foot Ball Club players
Esporte Clube Bahia players
Club Athletico Paranaense players
Sociedade Esportiva Matonense players
Paraná Clube players
Criciúma Esporte Clube players
Brazilian football managers
Campeonato Brasileiro Série A managers
Coritiba Foot Ball Club managers
América Futebol Clube (RN) managers
Associação Atlética Anapolina managers